Lie To Me is a South Korean television series  starring Kang Ji-hwan, Yoon Eun-hye, Sung Joon and Jo Yoon-hee.

The series revolves around a civil servant named Gong Ah-jung (played by Yoon) who pretends to be the wife of the wealthy hotel heir, Hyun Ki-joon (played by Kang) to impress her former friend. It is directed by Kim Soo-ryung and Kwon Hyuk-chan, produced by Jo Sung-won and written by Kim Ye-ri.

Synopsis
Gong Ah-jung (Yoon Eun-hye) is a government employee of the Ministry of Culture, Sports and Tourism. At the beginning of the series, Ah-jung lies to an antagonistic friend about being married, not to lose face in front of her. The lie quickly snowballs (due to several misunderstandings) until Ah-jung realizes that everyone is gossiping about her supposed, secret marriage to Hyun Ki-joon (Kang Ji-hwan), the very wealthy president of World Hotel.

As the gossip spreads, a miserable Ki-joon is forced to combat the rumors to his friends as he decides a plan of action in getting Ah-jung to correct her lie. Ki-joon and Ah-jung decide to take action to squash the rumors, with Ah-jung agreeing to call her friends together so she can confess her indiscretion. When this doesn't go as planned, Ki-joon decides to take legal action against Ah-jung. However, after a series of events that bond the pair, they agree that pretending to be married for a short while would be mutually beneficial—though Ki-joon promises that Ah-jung's lie is not forgiven and that he will eventually follow through with his lawsuit.

Things become even more complicated when Ki-joon's ex-fiancée returns from France. Ki-joon and Ah-jung grow closer and fonder of one another over the duration of their pretended marriage; Ki-joon finds himself questioning his commitment to his former fiancée Yoon-joo.

Cast
 Kang Ji-hwan as Hyun Ki-joon – CEO of World Hotel
 Yoon Eun-hye as Gong Ah-jung
 Sung Joon as Hyun Sang-hee – Ki-joon's brother
 Jo Yoon-hee as Oh Yoon-joo – Ki-joon's ex fiancée
 Hong Soo-hyun as Yoo So-ran – Ah-jung's frenemy
 Ryu Seung-soo as Chun Jae-bum – So-ran's husband and Ah-jung's first love
 Kwon Se-in as Park Hoon – Ki-joon's secretary
 Park Ji-yoon as Manager Park Ji-yoon – Ki-joon's friend and manager of the hotel
 Kang Shin-il as Gong Joon-ho – Ah-jung's dad
 Lee Kyung-jin as Shim Ae-kyung – Joon-ho's longtime love
 Kwon Hae-hyo as Hwang Seok-bong – Ae-kyung's admirer and Sang-hee's friend
 Kang Rae-yeon as Rae-yeon
 Song Ji-eun as Ji-eun
 Kim Bo-yeon as Bo-yeo
 Jang Woo-young as Kim Yeon-nim
 Kim Gyu-jin as Gyu-jin
 Ahn Jung-hoon as Manager Ahn
 Park Hyo-jun as Hyo-jun
 Ja Doo as Ja Doo
 Min Joon-hyun as journalist
 Danny Ahn as Ki-joon's friend (cameo)
 Choi Yoon-so as arranged marriage partner (cameo)
 Yoo Ha-na as herself (cameo)

Ratings

Source: TNmS Media Korea

Awards and nominations

References

External links 

 

Seoul Broadcasting System television dramas
2011 South Korean television series debuts
2011 South Korean television series endings
Korean-language television shows
South Korean romantic comedy television series